Boody may refer to:

People
 Boody Gilbertson (1922–2015), American professional basketball player
 Boody Rogers (1904–1996), American comic strip and comic book cartoonist
 Azariah Boody (1815–1885), American politician and a member of the United States House of Representatives from New York
 David A. Boody (1837–1930), American politician and a United States Representative from New York
 Meghan Boody (born 1964), surrealist photographer
 Robert Boody (1836–1913), American Civil War soldier

Other

 Boody, Illinois, an unincorporated census-designated place (CDP) in Illinois, United States
 Boody Hill, hill in Steuben, New York, United States
 David A. Boody (fireboat), fireboat built for the Brooklyn Fire Department and in service from 1892 to 1914
 Henry Boody House (also known as Boody-Johnson House), historic house in Maine, United States